Rajaportin sauna is Finland's oldest working public sauna. The sauna was founded in 1906 in Pispala in Tampere.

Rajaportin Sauna is owned by Tampere city and run by the Pispalan saunayhdistys ry.

References

External links
 Rajaportin sauna association homepage
 Media Reports

Buildings and structures in Tampere
Non-profit organisations based in Finland
Saunas